Marcin Rafał Możdżonek (born 9 February 1985) is a Polish former professional volleyball player, a member of the Polish national team in 2007–2016, a participant at the Olympic Games (Beijing 2008, London 2012), the 2014 World Champion, 2009 European Champion, and the 2012 World League.

Career

Clubs
In 2012-2014 Możdżonek played for ZAKSA Kędzierzyn-Koźle. With this club he won the Polish Cup twice (2013, 2014) and won the silver medal in the Polish Championship 2012/2013. In October 2014, he moved to Turkish club Halkbank Ankara. On March 29, 2015 he achieved his first trophy with his new club Halkbank Ankara – the Turkish Cup. In the final his team beat Arkas Izmir 3-0 and he scored 10 points. In July 2015 he came back to Poland and he signed a contract with MKS Cuprum Lubin.

National team
He debuted in the Polish national team in 2007 (during the Poland - Argentina match). Możdżonek was in the Polish squad when the Polish national team won the gold medal at the European Championship 2009. On September 14, 2009 he was awarded The Order of Polonia Restituta. The Order was conferred on the following day by the Prime Minister of Poland, Donald Tusk. With the Polish team, he won three medals in 2011 - silver at World Cup and two bronzes at World League and European Championship. In November 2011 he was declared the new captain of national team. He is a gold medalist of World League 2012 in Sofia, Bulgaria. In May 2014 he was replaced as captain by Michał Winiarski. On September 21, 2014 Poland won the title of World Champion 2014. On October 27, 2014, he received a state award granted by the Polish President, Bronisław Komorowski: the Officer's Cross of Polonia Restituta for outstanding sports achievements and worldwide promotion of Poland.

He was not called to the national team by Stephane Antiga for the 2016 Olympic Games in Rio de Janeiro.

Honours

Clubs
 CEV Champions League
  2011/2012 – with PGE Skra Bełchatów
 FIVB Club World Championship
  Doha 2009 – with PGE Skra Bełchatów
  Doha 2010 – with PGE Skra Bełchatów
 National championships
 2008/2009  Polish Cup, with PGE Skra Bełchatów
 2008/2009  Polish Championship, with PGE Skra Bełchatów
 2009/2010  Polish Championship, with PGE Skra Bełchatów
 2010/2011  Polish Cup, with PGE Skra Bełchatów
 2010/2011  Polish Championship, with PGE Skra Bełchatów
 2011/2012  Polish Cup, with PGE Skra Bełchatów
 2012/2013  Polish Cup, with ZAKSA Kędzierzyn-Koźle
 2013/2014  Polish Cup, with ZAKSA Kędzierzyn-Koźle
 2014/2015  Turkish Cup, with Halkbank Ankara

Youth national team
 2003  European Youth Olympic Festival
 2003  FIVB U21 World Championship

Individual awards
 2009: FIVB Club World Championship – Best Blocker
 2011: FIVB World Cup – Best Blocker
 2012: Polish Cup – Best Blocker
 2012: FIVB World League – Best Blocker

State awards
 2009:  Knight's Cross of Polonia Restituta
 2014:  Officer's Cross of Polonia Restituta

References

External links

 
 Player profile at PlusLiga.pl 
 
 
 Player profile at Volleybox.net

1985 births
Living people
Sportspeople from Olsztyn
Polish men's volleyball players
Polish Champions of men's volleyball
Olympic volleyball players of Poland
Volleyball players at the 2008 Summer Olympics
Volleyball players at the 2012 Summer Olympics
Knights of the Order of Polonia Restituta
Officers of the Order of Polonia Restituta
Polish expatriate sportspeople in Turkey
Expatriate volleyball players in Turkey
AZS Olsztyn players
Skra Bełchatów players
ZAKSA Kędzierzyn-Koźle players
Halkbank volleyball players
Cuprum Lubin players
Resovia (volleyball) players
Middle blockers